Cabwey Mereve Kivutuka (born 7 February 1998) is a Congolese international footballer who plays as a forward for Charlotte Independence and the Congo national football team. He was accepted into the Congolese National Team on March, 15, 2019.

Career 
Kivutuka first began his career at CARA Brazzaville in 2016. In 2018, he moved to the AS Otôho.

International statistics

References

1998 births
Living people
Republic of the Congo footballers
Republic of the Congo expatriate footballers
Republic of the Congo international footballers
Association football forwards
CARA Brazzaville players
AS Otôho players
Charlotte Independence players
Expatriate soccer players in the United States
USL Championship players